La Sexóloga (English: The Sexologist) is a Chilean telenovela that originally aired on Chilevisión in Chile on September 24, 2012.

Cast

Main cast 
 Claudia Di Girólamo as Olivia Pamplona
 Tiago Correa as Francisco "Pancho" Pamplona
 Isidora Urrejola as Florencia Garay
 Álvaro Morales as Gabriel Hidalgo
 Begoña Basauri as Griselda Garay
 Héctor Noguera as Hernan "Nano" Hidalgo

Supporting cast 

 Liliana Ross as Mabel Pamplona
 Roberto Vander as Axel Cooper
 Juan Falcón as Eloy Garay
 Bárbara Ruiz-Tagle as Romina Carvajal
 Catalina Pulido as Monica Cooper
 Ricardo Fernández as Esteban Encina
 Cristián Carvajal as German Riveros / Britney Paola
 Sofía García as Julieta Tamayo
 Felipe Contreras as Roberto Loyola "Robert Roberto"
 Malucha Pinto as Yolanda Tapia
 Willy Semler as Custodio Curilen
 Andrea Velasco as Cote Castillo
 Ariel Levy as Adamo Curilen
 Javiera Hernández as Bernardita Nuñez
 Eduardo Paxeco as Nicolay Curilén
 Mayte Rodríguez as Mariana Cooper "Sister Mariana"
 Antonio Campos as Lorenzo Nuñez
 Marcela del Valle as Dayana Cruz
 Juan Pablo Ogalde as DJ Kiss
 Francisca Castillo as Gloria Stevez
 Claudio Castellón as Wenceslao Carvajal

Special participations
 Diego Ruiz as Luis Miguel Garcia
 Schlomit Baytelman as Simona Rosino
 Alejandro Castillo as Doctor
 Osvaldo Silva as Julio Cesar Galvez
 Alejandra Herrera as Estefania "the Boa"
 Francisco Medina as Eduardo Encina
 Soledad Pérez as Soila
 Andreina Chataing as Vania
 Rodrigo Soto as Doctor Avendaño
 Ernesto Gutiérrez as Señor Patiño
 Ingrid Parra as Fernanda Bascuñan
 Aldo Parodi as Samuel
 Eyal Meyer as the membership of the committee
 Silvia Novak as Roberto's casual partner
 Luz María Yacometti as the judge it home as Gabriel and Griselda
 Catalina Vera as Radio Announcer

Soundtrack of La sexóloga 

 The Ting Tings - Great DJ (First main song)
 DJ Méndez - Constamente Mia (Second main song)
 Laura Pausini - Jamas Abandone (Song of Olivia)
 Vicentico - Algo Contigo (Song of Gabriel and Florencia))

International broadcasters of La sexóloga

South América 

 : Canal 9 (Premiere of La sexóloga on Canal 9 are broadcast from March 10, 2015 at 00:30 (local time)).
 : Canal 13 (Premiere of La sexóloga on Canal 13 are broadcast from March 3, 2015 at 22:00 (local time)).
 : Teleamazonas

External links
 Official website 

2012 telenovelas
2012 Chilean television series debuts
2013 Chilean television series endings
Chilean telenovelas
Spanish-language telenovelas
Chilevisión telenovelas